János Kőrössy (26 December 1926 – 21 January 2013) was a Romanian jazz musician of Hungarian descent. He was a piano player, composer and arranger.

He was born to an ethnic Hungarian family in Cluj. His first teacher was pianist and conductor Teodor Cosma, of whom he said, "I owe him everything, and for me the beginning is everything, the rest comes by itself." Kőrössy was noted for combining the musical language typical of jazz with elements of local folk music, a trend referred to as ethno jazz. He arranged in jazz-style George Enescu's Romanian Rhapsody No. 1.

Kőrössy's first name is spelled in many different ways: Hansel, Jancy, Jancsy, Iancsi, Yancy and Yancey. He became a well known jazz musician in the European Eastern bloc in the 1960s, appearing  at the International Jazz Festivals in Prague (1960), Warsaw (1961) and Budapest (1962). In 1969 he moved to West Germany and subsequently relocated to the United States, settling in Atlanta, Georgia. He played in Atlanta and in 1981 performed with Zoot Sims. After the Romanian Revolution, he returned to Romania, appearing in 1993 at the Costineşti and Galaţi jazz festivals and 2001 at the International Jazz Festival in Bucharest.

References

1926 births
2013 deaths
Romanian jazz pianists
Musicians from Cluj-Napoca
Romanian musicians of Hungarian descent
20th-century pianists